The California Juvenile Stakes is an American flat Thoroughbred horse race for two-year-olds held annually at Bay Meadows Racetrack in San Mateo, California. It is currently a discontinued stakes race that was run over a distance of 8 furlongs on dirt.

Winners 
2000 - Zillah the Hun
1999 - Globalize
1998 - Voice of Destiny
1997 - King Slewie
1995 - Mountain Skier
1994 - Valid Wager
1994 - Robannier
1993 - Lykatill Hil
1992 - Big Pal

Bay Meadows Racetrack
Discontinued horse races
Horse races in California
Flat horse races for two-year-olds
Previously graded stakes races in the United States